Takatsuki Station can refer to two different train stations in Japan:
, on the JR Kyoto Line in Takatsuki, Osaka, Japan
, on the Hokuriku Main Line in Nagahama, Shiga, Japan